The Hollow Nickel Case (or the Hollow Coin) was the FBI investigation that grew out of the discovery of a container disguised as a U.S. coin and containing a coded message, eventually found to concern espionage activities of William August Fisher ( Rudolf Ivanovich Abel) on behalf of the Soviet Union.

Background 

On June 22, 1953, a newspaper boy (fourteen-year-old Jimmy Bozart), collecting for the Brooklyn Eagle, at an apartment building at 3403 Foster Avenue in the New York City borough of Brooklyn, was paid with a nickel (U.S. five-cent piece) that felt too light to him. When he dropped it on the ground, it popped open, revealing that it contained microfilm. The microfilm contained a series of numbers. He told the daughter of a New York City Police Department officer, and that officer told a detective who in two days told an FBI agent about the strange nickel.

After agent Louis Hahn of the FBI obtained the nickel and the microfilm, the agency tried to find out where the nickel had come from and what the numbers meant. The coin had a 1948-dated obverse with the usual copper-nickel composition, but the reverse was minted sometime between October 1942 and the end of 1945, based on the copper-silver alloys used during this period. On the microfilm, there were five digits together in each number, 21 sets of five in seven columns and another 20 sets in three columns, making a total of 207 sets of five digits. There was no key for the numbers. The FBI tried for nearly four years to find the origin of the nickel and the meaning of the numbers.

It was when KGB agent Reino Häyhänen ( Eugene Nicolai Mäki) wanted to defect in May 1957 from Paris, that the FBI was able to link the nickel to KGB agents, including Mikhail Nikolaevich Svirin (a former United Nations employee) and William August Fisher. Häyhänen was being recalled to Moscow for good, and defected on the way back in Paris. The deciphered message in the nickel turned out to be only a personal message to Häyhänen from the KGB in Moscow welcoming him to the U.S. and instructing him on getting set up. He gave the FBI the information that it needed to crack the cipher and uncover the identity of his two main contacts in New York (Svirin and Fisher), and a nearly identically made Finnish 50-markka coin.

 WE CONGRATULATE YOU ON A SAFE ARRIVAL. WE CONFIRM THE RECEIPT OF YOUR LETTER TO THE ADDRESS `V REPEAT V' AND THE READING OF LETTER NUMBER 1.
 FOR ORGANIZATION OF COVER, WE GAVE INSTRUCTIONS TO TRANSMIT TO YOU THREE THOUSAND IN LOCAL (CURRENCY). CONSULT WITH US PRIOR TO INVESTING IT IN ANY KIND OF BUSINESS, ADVISING THE CHARACTER OF THIS BUSINESS.
 ACCORDING TO YOUR REQUEST, WE WILL TRANSMIT THE FORMULA FOR THE PREPARATION OF SOFT FILM AND NEWS SEPARATELY, TOGETHER WITH (YOUR) MOTHER'S LETTER.
 IT IS TOO EARLY TO SEND YOU THE GAMMAS. ENCIPHER SHORT LETTERS, BUT THE LONGER ONES MAKE WITH INSERTIONS. ALL THE DATA ABOUT YOURSELF, PLACE OF WORK, ADDRESS, ETC., MUST NOT BE TRANSMITTED IN ONE CIPHER MESSAGE. TRANSMIT INSERTIONS SEPARATELY.
 THE PACKAGE WAS DELIVERED TO YOUR WIFE PERSONALLY. EVERYTHING IS ALL RIGHT WITH THE FAMILY. WE WISH YOU SUCCESS. GREETINGS FROM THE COMRADES. NUMBER 1, 3RD OF DECEMBER.

In addition to Svirin and Fisher (code name "Mark"), Häyhänen (code name "Vic") told the FBI about Vitali G. Pavlov, a former Soviet embassy official in Ottawa; Aleksandr Mikhailovich Korotkov; and U.S. Army Sergeant Roy Rhodes (code name "Quebec"), who had once worked in the garage of the U.S. embassy in Moscow. The Soviets were able to get to Rhodes because they had "compromising materials" about him. Häyhänen and Fisher were in the United States mainly looking for information on the U.S. atomic program and U.S. Navy submarine information.

Svirin had returned to the Soviet Union in October 1956 and was not available for questioning or arrest.

When Fisher was arrested, the hotel room and photo studio that he lived in contained multiple items of modern espionage equipment: cameras and film for producing microdots, cipher pads, cufflinks, a hollow shaving brush, shortwave radios, and numerous "trick" containers.

Fisher, under the name Rudolf Ivanovich Abel, was brought to trial in New York City Federal Court and indicted as a Soviet spy in October 1957 on three counts:

 Conspiracy to transmit defense information to the Soviet Union
 Conspiracy to obtain defense information
 Conspiracy to act in the United States as an agent of a foreign government without notification to the Secretary of State.

Häyhänen testified against Fisher at the trial.

On October 25, 1957, the jury found Fisher guilty on all three counts. On November 15, 1957, Judge Mortimer W. Byers sentenced Fisher to three sentences to be served concurrently: 
 30 years' imprisonment; 
 10 years' imprisonment and $2,000 fine; 
 5 years' imprisonment and $1,000 fine.

On February 10, 1962, Fisher was exchanged for American Central Intelligence Agency Lockheed U-2 pilot Francis Gary Powers, who was a prisoner of the Soviet Union.

In popular culture
The case is dramatized in the 1959 film The FBI Story, starring James Stewart, with personal supervision by FBI director J. Edgar Hoover. The film compresses the time span from four years to just a couple of weeks, the Brooklyn newspaper boy is changed to a small Bronx clothes cleaning and pressing service, and changes the nickel to a half-dollar.

The Steven Spielberg film Bridge of Spies, released on October 16, 2015, also focuses on the events surrounding the Hollow Nickel Case and its historical ties to the Francis Gary Powers U-2 incident of 1960. The case was featured in a March 2016 episode of the American Heroes Channel's series, What History Forgot entitled Fighting for Freedom and focuses on Jimmy Bozart's role in breaking the case.

See also 
Concealment device
VIC cipher

References

External links 
 "Rudolph Ivanovich Abel (Hollow Nickel Case)" FBI.
 
 

Containers
Espionage techniques
Anti-communism in the United States
Espionage scandals and incidents
Soviet Union–United States relations